Command & Conquer: The First Decade is a compilation of the Command & Conquer series' games published from 1995 to 2003, bundled onto one DVD and updated to run optimally on Windows XP. It was released on February 7, 2006. Included in the compilation was a bonus DVD with a look behind the scenes of the franchise, including interviews with producers, concept art, various soundbites, as well as a montage of the winning fan videos of the "Are You The Biggest C&C Fan?" competition held prior to the compilation's release.

Other items included in the compilation was a poster with high-quality C&C renders on both sides, one of which has been confirmed to be a teaser image for EA's Command & Conquer 3: Tiberium Wars, as well as a manual that features unit descriptions and hotkeys for each of the included games.

Included games and expansions 
 Command & Conquer – September 1995
 Command & Conquer – The Covert Operations – April 1996
 Command & Conquer: Red Alert – November 1996
 Command & Conquer: Red Alert – Counterstrike – March 1997
 Command & Conquer: Red Alert – The Aftermath – September 1997
 Command & Conquer: Tiberian Sun – August 1999
 Command & Conquer: Tiberian Sun – Firestorm – March 2000
 Command & Conquer: Red Alert 2 – October 2000
 Command & Conquer: Yuri's Revenge – October 2001
 Command & Conquer: Renegade – February 2002
 Command & Conquer: Generals – February 2003
 Command & Conquer: Generals – Zero Hour – September 2003

Reception

The First Decade received a "Silver" sales award from the Entertainment and Leisure Software Publishers Association (ELSPA), indicating sales of at least 100,000 copies in the United Kingdom.

References

2006 video games
First Decade, The
Electronic Arts video game compilations
Video games developed in the United States
Windows games
Windows-only games
Real-time strategy video games
Barking Lizards games
Multiplayer and single-player video games